Jake Trbojevic (born 18 February 1994) also known as “Jurbo” is an Australian professional rugby league footballer who plays as a  and  for the Manly Warringah Sea Eagles in the NRL and Australia at international level.

Trbojevic has played at representative level for the Prime Minister's XIII and New South Wales in the State of Origin series.

Background
Trbojevic was born in Mona Vale, New South Wales, Australia. Trbojevic is the older brother of fellow Manly Warringah Sea Eagles Tom Trbojevic and Ben Trbojevic.

Trbojevic played his junior rugby league for Mona Vale Raiders in the Mona Vale rugby league, before being signed by the Manly Warringah Sea Eagles. During his time at Mona Vale Raiders Rugby League club, he was coached by Steve Wilson and assisted by Mitchel Murphy, both helped to shape Jake's rugby league career.

Trbojevic has played for the New South Wales U16's and U18's teams. In October 2011, Trbojevic played for the Australian Schoolboys. On 7 March 2012, Trbojevic re-signed with the Sea Eagles on a 2-year contract. Trbojevic played for the Sea Eagles NYC team in 2013. On 20 April 2013, Trbojevic was named in the New South Wales Under 20s team against the Queensland Under 20s team, Trbojevic played off the interchange bench in the 36–12 victory at Penrith Stadium. On 13 October 2013, Trbojevic played for the Junior Kangaroos against the Junior Kiwis off the interchange bench in the Kangaroos 38–26 win at Jubilee Oval.

Playing career

2013
In round 26 of the 2013 NRL season, Trbojevic made his NRL debut for the Manly Warringah Sea Eagles against the Penrith Panthers off the interchange bench in Manly's 38–26 loss at Brookvale Oval. Trbojevic only played 1 match for the Manly Warringah Sea Eagles in the 2013 NRL season.

2014
Trbojevic played no matches for the Manly Warringah Sea Eagles in the 2014 NRL season after suffering a broken leg and dislocated ankle in a New South Wales Cup match.

2015
In round 2 of the 2015 NRL season, Trbojevic played his first grade match for the Manly Warringah Sea Eagles since round 26 in the 2013 NRL season, playing against the Melbourne Storm off the interchange in the club's 24–22 win at Brookvale Oval. On 28 April 2015 Trbojevic re-signed with the Sea Eagles on a 2-year contract. In Round 20 against the New Zealand Warriors, Trbojevic scored his first NRL career try in the club's 32–12 win at Mt Smart Stadium. On the 8th of September, Trbojevic's form for Manly, which finished the season in 9th place with an 11–13 record (missing the finals for the first time since 2004) saw him win the clubs "Roy Bull Best & Fairest" award for the year. He played 23 games for Manly in 2015, scoring 3 tries, making 601 tackles, 2,559 metres and 247 hit ups. On 26 September, Trbojevic earned his first senior representative jumper when he played at prop for the Prime Minister's XIII against Papua New Guinea in the 40–12 win in Port Moresby.

2016
On 1 February Trbojevic was named as captain of the Sea Eagles' 2016 NRL Auckland Nines squad.

After again playing for the Prime Ministers XIII, on 13 October 2016, Trbojevic was called into the Australian Kangaroos squad for the 2016 Rugby League Four Nations tournament after Canberra Raiders forward Josh Papalii withdrew with an ankle injury. He made his test debut playing lock forward for Australia in the opening match of the Four Nations tournament against Scotland in Hull, England on 28 October and scored a try on debut. By playing in the match, he became Manly-Warringah's 68th Australian test player and the first local Manly junior to make his test debut for Australia since Anthony Watmough in the 2008 Rugby League World Cup.

2017
Manly coach Trent Barrett named Jake Trbojevic as vice-captain of Manly-Warringah for the 2017 NRL season with Daly Cherry-Evans named as captain, the pair taking over from retired captain Jamie Lyon and vice-captain Brett Stewart. Trbojevic finished the year with 23 games and 9 tries. At the end of the year, Trbojevic was selected in the 24 man squad to play for Australia with his younger brother Tom Trbojevic. He was injured in the first game of the World Cup and did not play for the rest of the tournament.

2018
Trbojevic played all three games for the New South Wales Blues on the Bench.  He was a shining light (alongside his younger brother and star fullback Tom Trbojevic) in an otherwise rocky season at the Manly-Warringah Sea Eagles. At the year's end, Trbojevic was selected to play in the Prime Minister's XIII which they went on to win 18 – 34.

2019

Trbojevic was selected by New South Wales to play in the 2019 State of Origin series after a good start to the season. Trbojevic played in all 3 matches as New South Wales won the series 2–1. It was the first time since 2005 that New South Wales had won back to back series.

Trbojevic made 25 appearances for Manly in the 2019 NRL season as the club qualified for the finals after finishing in sixth place.  Trbojevic played in the club's elimination final victory over Cronulla and also featured in Manly's elimination final loss against South Sydney where he was controversially sent to the sin bin for allegedly pushing a Souths player in the second half of the match.

On 30 September, Trbojevic was named at lock for the Australia PM XIII side. On 7 October, Trbojevic was named in the Australian side for the upcoming Oceania Cup fixtures.

2020
Trbojevic played 20 games for Manly in the 2020 NRL season.  The club missed the finals finishing 13th on the table.

Trbojevic was selected by New South Wales for the 2020 State of Origin series.  He played in all three games as New South Wales suffered a shock 2–1 series loss against an under strength Queensland side.

2021
On 30 May, he was selected for game one of the 2021 State of Origin series.
In round 25 of the 2021 NRL season, he scored two tries for Manly in a 46–18 victory over North Queensland.
He played 23 games for Manly in the 2021 NRL season including the club's preliminary final loss against South Sydney.

2022
Trbojevic was selected for game two and three of the 2022 State of Origin series which saw New South Wales lose the series 2-1.  

Trbojevic played 20 games for Manly in the 2022 NRL season as the club finished 11th.

In October Trbojevic was named in the Australia squad for the 2021 Rugby League World Cup.

He was part of the Australian side which won their 12th World Cup defeating Samoa 30-10 in the 2021 Rugby League World Cup Final.

References

External links

 Manly Sea Eagles profile
Manly Warringah Sea Eagles profile
NRL profile
2017 RLWC profile

 

1994 births
Living people
Australia national rugby league team players
Australian people of Serbian descent
Australian rugby league players
Junior Kangaroos players
Manly Warringah Sea Eagles captains
Manly Warringah Sea Eagles players
New South Wales Rugby League State of Origin players
Prime Minister's XIII players
Rugby league players from Sydney
Rugby league props